is a sumo wrestling simulation game for the Nintendo 64, which was released only in Japan in 1997. The gameplay simulates various aspects of a sumo wrestler's life, such as diets and training, and matches.

Ryan MacDonald of GameSpot gave the game a 3.9 out of 10, calling the graphics "mediocre at best" and the game likely to appeal only to "die-hard sumo fans."

Sequel
64 Ōzumō 2 (Rokujūyon Ōzumō Ni, lit. 64 Professional Sumo Wrestling 2) is a sequel released on March 19, 1999, also for the Nintendo 64. Like its predecessor, the gameplay simulates various aspects of a sumo wrestler's life.

See also
List of sumo video games

References

1997 video games
Bottom Up games
Japan-exclusive video games
Nintendo 64 games
Nintendo 64-only games
Sumo mass media
Fighting games
Video games developed in Japan
Multiplayer and single-player video games